The results of the Taekwondo Competition for men and women at the 2003 Pan American Games, held from August 13 to August 16, 2003, in Santo Domingo, Dominican Republic. There were a total number of 53 male and 45 female competitors.

Men's competition

– 58 kg

– 68 kg

– 80 kg

+ 80 kg

Women's competition

– 49 kg

– 57 kg

– 67 kg

+ 67 kg

Medal table

See also
Taekwondo at the 2004 Summer Olympics

References
 Sports 123
 WTF Results

P
2003
Events at the 2003 Pan American Games